Bradypodion baviaanense is endemic to South Africa.

References

Bradypodion
Endemic reptiles of South Africa
Reptiles described in 2022